"Mary, Did You Know?" is a Christmas song addressing Mary, mother of Jesus, with lyrics written by Mark Lowry in 1984, and music written by Buddy Greene in 1991. It was originally recorded by Christian recording artist Michael English on his self-titled debut solo album in 1991. At the time, English and Lowry were members of the Gaither Vocal Band, and Greene was touring with them. The song reached Number 6 on CCM Magazine's Adult Contemporary Chart. Lowry would record the song several times himself, most notably with the Gaither Vocal Band on their 1998 Christmas album, Still the Greatest Story Ever Told.

The song has since gone on to become a modern Christmas classic, recorded by hundreds of artists over the years, across multiple genres. Several recordings have reached the top ten in the Billboard R&B and Holiday charts. The song encourages contemplation of the relationship between Mary and her son, although some religious commentators have criticized the lyrics for downplaying Mary's own grace and understanding.

Music and lyrics 
"Mary, Did You Know?" was originally released in the key of E minor, with a tempo of 53 beats per minute in  meter, based around a chord progression of Em–D–Am7–B7sus4–B7. The lyrics evolved from a series of questions that Lowry scripted for a Christmas program at his church:

None of the questions are answered in the song. Instead, the lyrics poetically invite the listener to contemplate the relationship between Mary and her newborn divine son, even if her faith and awareness did not yet include the details of what would unfold.

The text has received both praise for reflecting the love of God, as well as criticism for perceived ambiguity or lack of theological depth. Baptist theologian Michael Frost suggested that it was the "most sexist Christmas song ever written... It treats her like a clueless child... Could you imagine a song asking Abraham 17 times if he knew he'd be the father of a great nation?" Robert McTeigue and Michelle Arnold, both Roman Catholic commentators, have questioned a particular line of text ("This Child that you delivered will soon deliver you") that might confuse or challenge the belief that Mary herself was conceived without sin. On the other hand the Roman Catholic author Karl Erickson implored people to praise Mary, Did You Know? as a "beautiful expression of God’s love for all of us" and responded to criticism of the piece, stating that "Mary, Did You Know is a song and not a theological essay. Even as simple Christmas music, however, it does a fine job conveying the beauty and profound mystery of the Incarnation. Yes, there is some poetic license taken within the lyrics, but much less than is taken within innumerable other songs we are asked to sing regularly—Sing a New Church, for example." Lutheran clergyman Timothy Koch states that criticism of the song is unwarranted because Mary, Did You Know? is simply poetry using rhetorical questions and that it is "actually communicating to the singer and hearer the truths about Jesus", including doctrines of salvation, homoousious, and the theotokos.

In 2017, Toronto-based theologian Jennifer Henry wrote new lyrics that address the criticisms and echo Mary's words from the biblical Magnificat. These new lyrics have begun to spread in religious settings.

Stage musical 
The song was used as the basis for a stage musical, written by David Guthrie and Bruce Greer and also titled Mary, Did You Know?, which won the 1999 Gospel Music Association Dove Award for Musical of the Year.

Charted cover recordings

Kenny Rogers and Wynonna Judd (1996) 

A duet, recorded by Wynonna Judd and Kenny Rogers on Rogers' holiday album The Gift, peaked at No. 55 on the Billboard Hot Country Singles & Tracks chart in 1997.

Chart positions

Clay Aiken (2004) 

"Mary, Did You Know?" is the fifth single from Clay Aiken's 2004 Christmas album Merry Christmas with Love. Aiken performed the song on The Tyra Banks Show.

Chart positions

CeeLo Green (2012) 

"Mary, Did You Know?" is the eleventh track on CeeLo Green's Christmas album Cee Lo's Magic Moment. On December 15, 2012, the song appeared on the US R&B Songs chart at number 22, and peaked three weeks later at number 9. This version is the slowest of all. A remixed version also served as the closing credits song to the 2014 20th Century Fox movie Son of God.

Chart positions

Pentatonix (2014) 

"Mary, Did You Know?" is the sixth track on Pentatonix's second Christmas album, That's Christmas to Me. The song both debuted and peaked at No. 26 on the weekly Billboard Hot 100 chart for the week ending December 6, 2014.

Chart positions

Jordan Smith (2015) 
In 2015, Jordan Smith performed the song on [[The Voice (U.S. season 9)|The Voice'''s season nine]] finals. This version debuted and peaked at No. 24 on the Billboard Hot 100 chart and at No. 2 on the Billboard Holiday 100 chart on the week ending January 2, 2016.

 Zara Larsson (2017) 

In 2017, Zara Larsson's cover of the song was included in the soundtrack to the film The Star, released on October 27, 2017. The cover went on to peak at number 55 on the Swedish charts during the 2018 holiday period, making another appearance for one week in 2019 at number 87.

 Carrie Underwood (2020) 
In 2020, Carrie Underwood included the song as the eighth track on her debut Christmas album, My Gift. Underwood's version charted on Billboards Hot Christian Songs, peaking at No. 31. Underwood performed the song on The Kelly Clarkson Show.

 Dolly Parton (2020) 

In 2020, Dolly Parton covered the song on her album A Holly Dolly Christmas. It was released as the first single from the album on August 21, 2020. Parton performed the song for the first time during a livestream event on Amazon Music on November 13, 2020. She also performed the song during NBC's annual Christmas in Rockefeller Center tree-lighting ceremony on December 2 and again during her CBS special A Holly Dolly Christmas on December 6. Parton's version of the song peaked at number 49 on the Billboard Hot Christian Songs chart and number 18 on the Billboard Christian Digital Song Sales chart.Chart positions'''

Maverick City Music (2022) 

Maverick City Music's version of "Mary Did You Know?" impacted Christian radio in the United States on November 25, 2022, becoming the first single from the album. Maverick City Music released the radio version of "Mary Did You Know?" On December 2, 2022.

References 

1991 songs
American Christmas songs
Marian hymns
Kenny Rogers songs
Wynonna Judd songs
Glen Campbell songs
Male–female vocal duets
Clay Aiken songs
Pentatonix songs
Song recordings produced by Walter Afanasieff
Song recordings produced by Brent Maher
RCA Records singles
Songs about Jesus
Cultural depictions of Mary, mother of Jesus